Orissa Jana Congress (Orissa Peoples Congress), generally just called the Jana Congress, was a political party in the Indian state of Orissa. The Jana Congress was formed in 1966 when Harekrushna Mahatab (former Orissa Chief Minister) left the Indian National Congress. After the 1967 elections the Jana Congress took part in a coalition government in the state together with Swatantra Party. That government lasted from 1967 to 1969. In the 1971 and 1974 state elections the Jana Congress fared badly, and could only win a single seat. In 1977 the Jana Congress merged into the Janata Party.

See also
Indian National Congress breakaway parties

References

Defunct political parties in Odisha
1966 establishments in Orissa
Political parties established in 1966
Political parties disestablished in 1977
Indian National Congress breakaway groups